Denis "Denny" Larocque (born October 5, 1967), is a Canadian former professional ice hockey player who played in 8 games for the Los Angeles Kings in the National Hockey League, during the 1987-88 season.

External links
 

1967 births
Living people
Los Angeles Kings draft picks
Los Angeles Kings players
People from Hawkesbury, Ontario
Ice hockey people from Ontario
Franco-Ontarian people
Canadian ice hockey defencemen
Guelph Platers players
New Haven Nighthawks players
Denver Rangers players
Flint Spirits players
Cape Breton Oilers players
Moncton Hawks players
Dayton Bombers players